There are 10 theological seminaries officially affiliated with the Episcopal Church in the United States of America. Several universities and higher education colleges also have Episcopal Church origins and current affiliations. The Association of Episcopal Colleges is a consortium of colleges with historic and present ties to the Episcopal Church which works to support many of these institutions through the Episcopal Church.

Seminaries

Berkeley Divinity School at Yale, New Haven, Connecticut
Bexley Seabury Seminary (formerly Seabury-Western Theological Seminary), Chicago, Illinois
Church Divinity School of the Pacific, Berkeley, California
Episcopal Divinity School at Union, New York, New York
General Theological Seminary, New York City
Nashotah House, Nashotah, Wisconsin
School of Theology at The University of the South, Sewanee, Tennessee
Seminary of the Southwest, Austin, Texas
Virginia Theological Seminary, Alexandria, Virginia

Colleges

Bard College, Annandale-on-Hudson, New York
Clarkson College, Omaha, Nebraska
Hobart and William Smith Colleges, Geneva, New York
Trinity College, Hartford, Connecticut
Kenyon College, Gambier, Ohio
St. Augustine College, Chicago, Illinois
St. Augustine's University, Raleigh, North Carolina
University of the South, Sewanee, Tennessee
Voorhees University, Denmark, South Carolina

Formerly affiliated
College of William & Mary, Williamsburg, Virginia  (prior to 1786; now a state-supported institution)
Columbia University, New York City (now a non-sectarian institution)
Lehigh University, Bethlehem, Pennsylvania (prior to 1907)
Racine College, Racine, Wisconsin (1852 to 1889; defunct)
Shimer College, Chicago (1959 to 1973, now non-sectarian)
St. Paul's College, Lawrenceville, Virginia (1888 to 2013; defunct)
Boise State University, Boise, Idaho (until 1938, now a public institution)
Trinity School for Ministry, Ambridge, Pennsylvania (until 2022, now affiliated solely with the Anglican Church in North America)

References

External links
Association of Episcopal Colleges

Episcopal
Episcopal
 
Episcopal Church (United States)
Episcopal
Episcopal
Colleges